The Vestri women's basketball team, commonly known as Vestri, is a basketball team based in Ísafjörður, Iceland. It is part of the Vestri multi-sport club.

History
The club was founded in 1965 as Körfuknattleiksfélag Ísafjarðar (KFÍ). In 1969, KFÍ won the Vesturland's group and was slated to face Þór Akureyri, which won the Norðurland's group, in a game for the national championship. KFÍ forfeited the game as they could not field a team at the date of the game. The team participated in the top-tier Úrvalsdeild kvenna from 1999 to 2002, advancing to the semi-finals in the Úrvalsdeild playoffs in 2001. It made it into the final four of the Icelandic Cup in 2000 and 2001. In 2016 KFÍ merged into Íþróttafélagið Vestri and became its basketball sub-division. After playing in the 2. deild kvenna for the 2018–2019 season, the team returned to the second-tier 1. deild kvenna in June 2020.

In July 2021, Dimitris Zacharias was hired as the head coach of the team. In end of November, Zacharias resigned and was replaced by former coach Pétur Már Sigurðsson. In June 2022, the board decided not to register the team for the next season competition.

Trophies and awards

Awards
Úrvalsdeild Women's Foreign Player of the Year
Jessica Gaspar – 2001
Ebony Dickinson – 2000

Úrvalsdeild Women's Domestic All-First Team
Sólveig Helga Gunnlaugsdóttir – 2001

Úrvalsdeild Women's Young Player of the Year
Sara Pálmadóttir – 2002

1. deild kvenna Domestic All-First team
Eva Margrét Kristjánsdóttir – 2015

Notable players

Head coaches
Women's head coaches since 1996:

Karl Jónsson 1999–2001
Krste Seramofski 2001–2002
Neil Shiran Þórisson 2002–2003
Hrafn Kristjánsson 2003–2004
Tom Hull 2004–2005
Pance Ilievski 2010–2011
Pétur Már Sigurðsson 2011–2013
Labrenthia Murdock Pearson 2014–2015
Helga Salóme Ingimarsdóttir 2018–2019
Pétur Már Sigurðsson 2020–2021
Dimitris Zacharias 2021
Pétur Már Sigurðsson 2021–2022

References

External links
Vestri team info at kki.is

Basketball teams in Iceland
Basketball teams established in 1965